Thirupalaikudi (natively known as TPK) is a small town in R. S. Mangalam  Taluka in Ramanathapuram District of the Indian state of Tamil Nadu.

Geography 
It is near the Bay of Bengal and features a humid climate. It is located 24 kilometres north of District headquarters Ramanathapuram and  480 kilometres from State capital Chennai. Thiruppalaikudi is surrounded by Ramanathapuram, Devipattinam, Thondi, R. S. Mangalam, Nambuthalai

History 
Thiruppalaikudi achieved district status on 30 September 1989, after it separated from the then-called North Arcot District.

Economy 
Thirupalaikudi is located marine landscape, the people of this village earn their main income from fishing, and they also earn income through self-employment such as animal husbandry, agriculture, construction, and part-time wage work such as salting and shrimp farming, Apart from being an area with less natural resources and water resources, a certain percentage of the men from this village earn their income in the Persian Gulf region, Southeast Asian countries, America and Europe as a migrate workers.

References

Villages in Ramanathapuram district